Javier Fuentes-León is a Peruvian film director based in Los Angeles and best known for his directorial long-feature debut Undertow (Spanish title Contracorriente) that starred Cristian Mercado as Miguel, a fisherman who is torn between his love for his pregnant wife Mariela played by Tatiana Astengo and a painter artist Santiago played by Manolo Cardona.

The film, a co-production between Peru, Colombia, France and Germany, was nominated for the Grand Jury Prize in the Dramatic category at the 2010 Sundance Film Festival and actually won the World Cinema Audience Award . It also won the Sebastiane Award at the San Sebastián International Film Festival.

Fuentes-León was born in Peru and graduated from Medical School in Peru, but made a radical change by moving to Los Angeles in 1994 to pursue a career in film directing by studying for a Master of Fine Arts (MFA) at the California Institute of the Arts (CalArts). His thesis film, Espacios won the National Award for Short Films from the Peruvian government in 1997. He also wrote a theatrical piece Mr. Clouds in 2000, which the National Theater of Peru considered among the best of the year and published it in the compilation Dramaturgia Nacional 2000.

In the following years, Fuentes-León worked as the lead writer for reality TV shows at the Telemundo in the U.S., subtitled films from major Hollywood studios into Spanish, and worked as an editor of commercials and TV shows, including Rachael Ray's Tasty Travels for the Food Network, while focusing on his own writing and directing projects.

His second short Géminis premiered at Outfest in 2004 and screened at various international film festivals.

Currently, Fuentes-León is developing various projects including The Woman Who Feared the Sun (based on his play Mr. Clouds) and Sinister, a rock musical set in a restrictive society of the near future, for which Fuentes-León is writing the music as well.

Filmography
Director
1997: Espacios (short)
2004: Géminis (short)
2009: Undertow (Spanish title Contracorriente)
2014: The Vanished Elephant
2020: The Best Families
Producer
2004: Géminis (short)
2009: Undertow

Screenwriter
1997: Espacios (short)
2004: Géminis (short)
2009: Undertow
2017: Av. Larco
2020: The Best Families

Editor
1997: Espacios (short)
2004: Géminis (short)
2005: Un dia en la vida (short)
2008: Rachael Ray's Tasty Travels (TV series documentary) (episode: "Martha's Vineyard")

Actor
2004: Géminis as Géminis (short)
2006: I Heart as Karoke Buddy (short)
 
Others
2007: Spine Tingler! The William Castle Story (documentary) (special thanks)
2008: Wrangler: Anatomy of an Icon (documentary) (special thanks)
2011: Vito (documentary) (special thanks)

Awards and nominations
For Undertow
2009: Won Sebastiane Award at the San Sebastián International Film Festival
2010: Won Audience Awards for "World Cinema - Dramatic" category at the Sundance Film Festival
2010: Nominated for Grand Jury Prize for "World Cinema - Dramatic" category at the Sundance Film Festival
2010: Won Audience Award at the Lima Latin American Film Festival
2010: Won Audience Award for Ibero-American competition at Miami Film Festival
2010: Nominated for Golden India Catalina for "Best Film (Mejor Película)" at Cartagena Film Festival
2011: Nominated for Goya for "Best Spanish Language Foreign Film" at Goya Awards

References

Living people
Year of birth missing (living people)
Peruvian film directors
Peruvian LGBT writers
LGBT film directors
Peruvian LGBT screenwriters
Peruvian screenwriters
Male screenwriters